His Majesty's Courts and Tribunals Service (HMCTS) is an executive agency of the Ministry of Justice.  It was created on 1 April 2011 (as Her Majesty's Courts and Tribunals Service) by the merger of Her Majesty's Courts Service and the Tribunals Service.

The agency is responsible for the administration of the courts of England and Wales, the Probate Service and tribunals in England and Wales and non-devolved tribunals in Scotland and Northern Ireland. It works from about 600 locations across the United Kingdom.

Role

The organisation's Framework Document says its aim is "to run an efficient and effective courts and tribunals system, which enables the rule of law to be upheld and provides access to justice for all." The courts over which it has responsibility are the Court of Appeal, the High Court, the Crown Court, the magistrates' courts, and the county courts.

The agency is responsible for the administration of all chambers of the First-tier Tribunal and Upper Tribunal, together with the employment tribunals and certain other tribunals which the Tribunals Service was responsible for serving, such as the Special Immigration Appeals Commission and Proscribed Organisations Appeal Commission.

The Supreme Court has a separate administration from the other courts of England and Wales, and its administration is under a Chief Executive who is appointed by the President of the Supreme Court of the United Kingdom.

Accountability

The service remains operationally independent, and the responsibility for overseeing the leadership and direction of the agency rests with its Board, three of whose members are judicial officeholders and one of whom is Senior Presiding Judge. The Chief Executive is responsible for the day-to-day operations and administration of the agency, and is the Accounting Officer for the agency.

The Lord Chancellor is required by section 1 of the Courts Act 2003 and section 39 of the Tribunals, Courts and Enforcement Act 2007 to ensure there is an efficient and effective system to support the carrying on of the business of courts and tribunals, and it is to the Lord Chancellor that the agency is accountable, and the Lord Chancellor is in turn responsible for accounting for its operations to Parliament.

HMCTS is an executive agency, in contrast with the Scottish Courts and Tribunals Service which is a non-ministerial government department. However, it is unique in being such an agency and having constitutional accountability to judges as well as the Lord Chancellor. The framework document says that the agency is accountable to the Lord Chief Justice of England and Wales and the Senior President of Tribunals. This provides a unique partnership between all three in relation to the effective governance, financing and operation of His Majesty’s Courts and Tribunals Service. For example, where the Board cannot reach agreement, its Chair will refer the issue in question to the Lord Chancellor and the Lord Chief Justice for a decision.

Any amendment of the framework document must be agreed between all parties, and laid before Parliament. Furthermore, the Lord Chief Justice (and the Senior President) is entitled to terminate the partnership if either concludes that it is no longer compatible with his constitutional position or the independence of the judiciary. By doing so, a report will be presented before both Houses of Parliament of that fact, and the governance of HMCTS will revert to a conventional agency model reporting directly to the Lord Chancellor unless and until a new model is agreed between the Lord Chancellor and Lord Chief Justice or a different legislative framework is put in place.

Money Claim Online
Money Claim Online (MCOL) is a UK government Internet-based service by His Majesty's Courts and Tribunals Service for claimants and defendants in England and Wales. It states that it is "a convenient and secure way of making or responding to a money claim on the Internet". The claim must be made by a single claimant against at most two people or organisations, and is normally for a fixed amount.

Civil Procedure Rule Practice Direction 7E describes the Money Claim Service in more detail.

Chief Executives
Peter Handcock , 2011 – January 2015 (previously Chief Executive of the Tribunals Service)
Natalie Ceeney CBE, January 2015 – May 2016
Kevin Sadler CBE, May 2016 – November 2016 Interim Chief Executive
Susan Acland-Hood, November 2016 – August 2020.
Kevin Sadler CBE, August 2020 – March 2022 as Acting Chief Executive
Nick Goodwin, since March 2022.

Interpreter service
The service privatised their language interpretation service in 2011, giving a contract to Capita Translation and Interpreting. Figures released to The Guardian in 2016 show that over 2,600 court cases were adjourned because of a failure to provide an adequate interpreter in the previous five years.

From 31 October 2016 these services have been delivered under four separate Lots through the following providers: 
 Lot 1 – Spoken Face to face, telephone and video interpretation - thebigword Group Ltd
 Lot 2 – Translation and Transcription services - thebigword Group Ltd
 Lot 3 – Non-Spoken Languages - Clarion UK Ltd
 Lot 4 – Quality Assurance Services - The Language Shop

Most translation into Welsh and Welsh-English interpretation is sourced through HMCTS’ own Welsh Language Unit.

Statistics on the use of language interpreter and translation services in courts and tribunals forms part of the quarterly Criminal Court Statistics available through the GOV.UK website.

References

External links
 

Executive agencies of the United Kingdom government
Legal organisations based in London
2011 establishments in the United Kingdom
Court administration
Organizations established in 2011